Canton is an unincorporated community in Jackson and Jones counties, Iowa, United States. There is a restaurant there, and no other businesses or services.

History
In the mid-19th century, Canton contained a flouring mill, a saw mill and a woolen factory powered by the waters of its river. Canton's population was 210 in 1902, and 75 in 1925.

References

Unincorporated communities in Iowa
Unincorporated communities in Jackson County, Iowa
Unincorporated communities in Jones County, Iowa